DragonBlade: The Legend of Lang is a 2005 Hong Kong 3D CGI animated adventure fantasy action comedy family martial arts film edited by Chi-Leung Kwong, written by Trevor Morris with music by Kin Law and produced by Stanley Tong. It is the first 3D-CGI Chinese animated feature film from Hong Kong and directed by Antony Szeto. It was co-produced by DCDC and China Film company, and is also considered the first 3D-rendered martial arts film. The film features the voices of Karen Mok, Daniel Wu, Stephen Fung and Sandra Ng. DragonBlade: The Legend of Lang was theatrically released on January 6, 2005 by ERA company and Kantana Animation and was released on DVD and VOD on December 22, 2005 by Era. The film earned $1,966,342 on a USD$10 million budget. It received a Golden Horse Awards nomination for Best Animation Feature.

Plot
A town is attacked by a deadly creature, it can only be stopped with the Dragon Blade. The one person who knows where the blade is won't tell Lang, and even if he did, untold peril will fall on anyone who dares to find this legendary weapon.

Cast

Production

The reigning all-China wushu champions gathered together in Shandong where the director and animators flew to learn more about the diversity of martial arts for the film. Although DragonBlade was completely made in Hong Kong, the film was originally animated and lip-synced to English first. This is because it is technically easier to dub from English to Cantonese than the other way around. The MTR transportation service promoted the movie with a Dragonblade octopus card.  Since this movie is the first 3D-CG film fully rendered in Hong Kong, the card is now a rare collectible item. The idea of using "outtakes" (better known as "NG"s in Hong Kong) during the end credits was used by the director as a homage to Jackie Chan films. The film was filmed at Beijing, China, Hong Kong, China and Yun Cheng, Shandong, China in 2005. The film's music was composed by Kin Law.

Release
DragonBlade: The Legend of Lang was theatrically released on January 6, 2005 by ERA company and Kantana Animation and was released on DVD and VOD on December 22, 2005 by Era.

Awards and nominations
Australian Screen Directors' Association 2006

Golden Horse Film Festival 2005

Hong Kong Digital Entertainment Excellence Awards 2004

See also
 List of animated feature-length films
 List of computer-animated films

References

External links
 DragonBlade at the China Movie Database
 

2005 films
2005 animated films
Hong Kong animated films
2000s Cantonese-language films
2000s English-language films
2000s Mandarin-language films
2005 computer-animated films
Martial arts fantasy films
Wushu films
2005 martial arts films
2005 fantasy films
2000s Hong Kong films